Rhodocybe is a  small genus of small and medium-sized brownish-pink spored mushrooms, or (following recent mycological research) it is a subgroup of genus Clitopilus.  These mushrooms are saprotrophic and most grow on the ground, but some are found on wood.  Most are drab in appearance, though a few have vivid colors.

Description
The cap shape can be convex, plane, or depressed.  The gills usually have adnate to decurrent attachment, rarely notched and the stems of the mushrooms are highly variable, but always lack a veil or volva.

The spores are flesh-colored to salmon to brownish pink.   Microscopically the shape of the spores is important in defining the group.

About 20 species of Rhodocybe have been documented in Europe, but R. gemina (sometimes wrongly named R. truncata) is the commonest and best known, though rare in Britain.  The type species is Rhodocybe caelata (Fr.) Maire.

Little is known about the edibility of Rhodocybes, but one prominent mushroom guide indicates that R. gemina (or Clitopilus geminus) is good to eat.

Taxonomic status
The group belongs to family Entolomataceae (with pink spore print and angular spores) and the members are similar to some  Entoloma  or Clitopilus species, being distinguished by spore shape; essentially Entoloma spores are polyhedral (angular in all views), Clitopilus spores have longitudinal ridges, and Rhodocybes spores are angular when viewed on end but bumpy to weakly angular when viewed from the side.  But in 2009, CoDavid et al. found that Clitopilus species form a clade nested within the Rhodocybe species and proposed that these genera should be merged so that the new genus would be monophyletic.  Since the name Clitopilus  is older, it takes precedence and the name Rhodocybe should be dropped.

Rhodocybe is divided into four subsections - Rhodocybe, Rhodophana (now considered a separate genus according to Species Fungorum and a paper of 2013), Decurrentes, and Rufobrunneua.

References
 One hundred and seventeen clades of euagarics. Molecular Phylogenetics and Evolution

External links 
 The genus Rhodocybe
 Key to Rhodocybe in South America

Entolomataceae
Taxa named by René Maire
Taxa described in 1926